Marjorie Armstrong Post (November 4, 1950 – August 7, 2021), known professionally as Markie Post, was an American actress. She is known for her roles as bail bondswoman Terri Michaels in The Fall Guy on ABC from 1982 to 1985, as public defender Christine Sullivan on the NBC sitcom Night Court from 1985 to 1992, as Georgie Anne Lahti Hartman on the CBS sitcom Hearts Afire from 1992 to 1995, and as Barbara ‘Bunny’ Fletcher, mother of Sophia Bush’s character, Detective Erin Lindsay, from 2014 to 2017 in 18 episodes of Chicago P.D. across seasons 2-4.

Early life
Post was born in Palo Alto, California, on November 4, 1950. Her father, Richard F. Post, worked as a physicist; her mother, Marylee (Armstrong) Post, was a poet. The second of the couple's three children, she and her two siblings were raised in Stanford and Walnut Creek. She attended Las Lomas High School where she was a cheerleader. Post then attended Lewis & Clark College in Portland, Oregon, and briefly attended Pomona College in California before returning to Lewis & Clark to earn her Bachelor of Arts degree.

Career
Prior to acting, Post worked on several game shows. She began her career with the production crew of the Tom Kennedy version of Split Second. She also served as associate producer of CBS's Double Dare and as a card dealer on NBC's Card Sharks. Later, after achieving fame as an actress, she played various game shows as a celebrity guest, including The Match Game-Hollywood Squares Hour, Super Password, The (New) $25,000 Pyramid, and The $100,000 Pyramid. She helped a contestant win the $100,000 grand prize in a November 1987 tournament episode of The $100,000 Pyramid.

Post's early acting credits included a 1979 episode of Barnaby Jones and the pilot episode of Simon & Simon "Details at Eleven" in 1981, episode one of season two of The Greatest American Hero, two episodes of The A-Team as two different characters in the 1983 episode "The Only Church in Town" and the 1984 episode "Hot Styles", and The Love Boat. She appeared in the science-fiction series Buck Rogers in the 25th Century and as Diane Chambers' best friend in the sitcom Cheers, before eventually becoming a regular on the ABC action drama The Fall Guy. After The Fall Guy, she played Christine Sullivan on the 1980s television comedy series Night Court from the third season until the show's end. She played Georgie Anne Lahti Hartman on the comedy series Hearts Afire, co-starring John Ritter. Post also had regularly recurring guest-star roles on The District and on Scrubs as the mother of Dr. Elliot Reid.

Her film credits include There's Something About Mary (1998), in which Post played Mary's mother. She played a call girl and dominatrix in the 1988 TV movie Tricks of the Trade opposite Cindy Williams, and a singer in Glitz with Jimmy Smits, based on the novel by Elmore Leonard. She also had a starring role in NBC's 1995 movie Visitors in the Night. She appeared as reporter Christine Merriweather in the 2007 improvisational comedy film (released in 2017) Cook Off!. She appeared in the 30 Rock episode "The One with the Cast of Night Court" playing herself when Harry Anderson, Charles Robinson, and she staged a mock reunion of the Night Court cast.

Post was the voice of June Darby on the computer-animated robot superhero TV series Transformers: Prime. She appeared as recurring character Barbara 'Bunny' Fletcher in the first four seasons of Chicago P.D.

Personal life
Post was married first to Stephen Knox, whom she met at Lewis & Clark College. She later married actor and writer Michael A. Ross, with whom she had two daughters.

Death
Post died at her home in Los Angeles on August 7, 2021, aged 70, after battling cancer for almost four years.

Filmography

Film

Television

Awards and nominations

 1994 CableACE Award for Children's Program Special - 6 and Young (Presidential Inaugural Celebration for Children) – Won

References

External links
 
 
 
 

1950 births
2021 deaths
20th-century American actresses
21st-century American actresses
Actresses from Palo Alto, California
American film actresses
American television actresses
American voice actresses
Deaths from cancer in California
Game show models
Lewis & Clark College alumni
People from Walnut Creek, California
Pomona College alumni